Toddin is a municipality  in the Ludwigslust-Parchim district, in Mecklenburg-Vorpommern, Germany. The former municipality Setzin was merged into Toddin in May 2019.

References

Ludwigslust-Parchim